Christiane de Araújo Lessa (born 6 September 1982) is a Brazilian football manager and former player who played as a midfielder.

Career
Born in Brasília but raised in Niterói, Rio de Janeiro, Lessa represented Vasco da Gama and Fluminense's youth setup before playing for Team Chicago Brasil. She subsequently turned down a call up from the under-17 national team in order to move to the United States and play college football.

In 2002, Lessa was in the roster of Union College's Lady Bulldogs which qualified for the NAIA Women's Soccer Championship for the first time ever. She subsequently played for St. Thomas University's STU Bobcats before moving to Iceland with Haukar in 2005.

On 28 June 2006, Lessa joined Fylkir still in Iceland. She returned to the US in 2007 with Plantation FC, being later a part of Miami Kickers' squad before leaving in 2010.

Back in 2008, Lessa helped in the creation of the women's team of Florida Memorial University's Florida Memorial Lions, being their manager until 2011. In 2012, she was named head coach of the Iowa Central Community College's women's soccer programme.

On 21 January 2016, Lessa was appointed the head coach of Young Harris College's Young Harris Mountain Lions. On 20 October of the following year she took over Washington Spirit's Academy, before moving back to Iceland as the coach of Avaldsnes.

In 2019, after a short period as a head coach of Shandong Luneng's youth sides, Lessa joined Denise Reddy's staff at Sky Blue. She later became the first woman to take part of a men's team's squad, after being named Roberto Neves' assistant at Atlanta SC.

In 2020, Lessa returned to Brazil to take over Foz Cataratas, but left the club amidst the COVID-19 pandemic. On 25 January 2021, she was named in charge of Santos.

On 9 June 2021, Lessa resigned from Santos despite having seven wins in 13 matches.

References

External links 
 

1982 births
Footballers from Brasília
Living people
Brazilian women's footballers
Brazilian football managers
Female association football managers
Brazilian expatriate women's footballers
Expatriate women's soccer players in the United States
Expatriate women's footballers in Iceland
Santos FC (women) managers
Women's association football midfielders
Brazilian expatriate sportspeople in the United States
Brazilian expatriate sportspeople in Iceland
Brazilian expatriate sportspeople in China
Brazilian expatriate football managers
Expatriate soccer managers in the United States
Expatriate football managers in Iceland
Expatriate football managers in China
Florida Memorial Lions
Iowa Central Tritons women's soccer coaches
Young Harris Mountain Lions women's soccer coaches